Little Windows is a collaborative studio album by Teddy Thompson and Los Angeles based singer Kelly Jones, released on 1 April 2016. The album reached number 1 on the UK country album chart following its release.

Track listing

Charts

References

2016 albums
Collaborative albums
Cooking Vinyl albums
Teddy Thompson albums